"" (Winter night) is an art song for voice and piano composed by Richard Strauss in 1886, setting a poem of the same title by the German poet Adolf Friedrich von Schack (1815–1894). The song is part of his collection Five songs for middle voice and piano, Op. 15, TrV 148.

Composition history

Strauss set 4 songs by Adolf von Schack in his opus 15 songs. Von Schack, who was still alive in 1886, was a notable member of the Munich cultural elite, a member of the academy of sciences, notable art collector and prime mover in Bavarian literary life. Strauss starts the poem "with rain and roaring wind," writes Alan Jefferson. It will be seen that the rain and roaring wind are not the real content of this poem, for in spite of the storm raging outside the singer and his lady turn it into an indoor spring with their lovemaking. Strauss points this when he comes out of G minor, D minor and B-flat minor into the tranquil G major passage.  Though in reminding us what is still going on outside, the song ends with the first motif, with the penultimate chord (C minor with added 6th) avoiding the conventional G minor close by going into G major instead.

Lyrics

Commentary 
Rufus Hallmark in German Lieder in the Nineteenth Century describes the song as 'rarely performed' and comments that it "offers examples of the Straussian word painting found in many of his lieder...the recurrent piano motive...dramatically anticipates [the] tumult of the storm...a subtle unifying idea in the vocal line is the simple stepwise quarter-note descent. The first two stanzas in G minor give way to G major and a more lyrical, calmer portrayal of drifting snowflakes and thoughts of love and springtime." Critic Charles Osborne has described it as "disappointingly pedestrian." However, the song may be experiencing a revival: two recent collections of Strauss songs, one from 2014 by American bass baritone Thomas Hampson and one from 2015 by German soprano Katharina Persicke have included the song in their selection.

References
Notes

Sources

 Norman Del Mar, Richard Strauss. A Critical Commentary on his Life and Works, Volume 3, London: Faber and Faber (2009)[1968] (second edition), .
 Jefferson, Alan. (1971) The Lieder of Richard Straus, Cassel and Company, London.  
 Schuh, W. Richard Strauss: A Chronicle of the Early Years 1864-1898, (translated by Mary Wittal), Cambridge University Press, 1982. .
 Trenner, Franz (2003) Richard Strauss Chronik, Verlag Dr Richard Strauss Gmbh, Wien, .

External links
 Text and translation

Songs about nights
Songs by Richard Strauss
1886 songs